Cák is a village in Vas County, Hungary. It is 25 km away from Szombathely and 6 km south from Kőszeg.

History
In Cák graves have been found from Roman times. The earliest known reference to the village was from 1279 as Villa Chak. Turks destroyed the village in 1532, and Christian soldiers burned it down in 1573 and 1606.

External links 
 Street map

References

Populated places in Vas County